Fishing Creek (also called Fishing Hollow Branch) is a stream in Henry County in the U.S. state of Missouri. It is a tributary of the South Grand River.

Fishing Creek was named for the fishing activity along its course.

See also
List of rivers of Missouri

References

Rivers of Henry County, Missouri
Rivers of Missouri